Constance J. Milstein is an American attorney and businesswoman who serves as the United States ambassador to Malta since October 2022.

Early life and education
Milstein earned her Bachelor of Science from New York University and her Juris Doctor from North Carolina Central University.

Career
She co-founded Ogden CAP Properties, LLC. She has an extensive history of advocating for veterans and active military members; She is a founding board member of Blue Star Families, as well as founding Dog Tag bakery, which helps disabled veterans. Milstein has worked with several groups surrounding geopolitical issues and relations, including the School of Diplomacy and International Relations at Seton Hall University, United Nations Association, Refugees International, and UN Watch.

Obama administration
During the Obama administration, Milstein served as an aide to the Secretary of the Army.

United States ambassador to Malta
On December 8, 2021, President Joe Biden nominated Milstein to be the ambassador to Malta. Hearings on her nomination were held before the Senate Foreign Relations Committee on May 4, 2022. The committee favorably reported the nomination on May 18, 2022. Her nomination was confirmed by the Senate by a vote of 56–35 on August 6, 2022. She presented her credentials to President George Vella on October 27, 2022.

Awards and recognitions
Milstein has won several awards, including the Angel Award from Blue Star Families; she has also won the Distinguished Service Award from the New York University College of Arts & Science and the Albert Gallatin Medal from there as well.

Personal life
Milstein speaks French and Italian.

References

Ambassadors of the United States to Malta
Living people
Year of birth missing (living people)
American lawyers
American women lawyers
American women diplomats
North Carolina Central University alumni
Obama administration personnel
21st-century American diplomats